This is a list of mayors of the city of Kalamazoo.

References

Kalamazoo, Michigan
 Mayors